Lise Olivier (born 30 May 1983) is a South African former road cyclist. She participated at the 2012 UCI Road World Championships.

Major results

2010
 2nd  Road race, African Road Championships
2011
 All-Africa Games
1st  Time trial
2nd  Road race
2012
 2nd Road race, National Road Championships
 3rd  Road race, African Road Championships
 4th Overall La Route de France
2013
 3rd Time trial, National Road Championships
2015
 African Games
2nd  Team time trial
3rd  Road race
3rd  Time trial
 2nd  Road race, African Road Championships
 KZN Autumn Series
2nd Hibiscus Cycle Classic
3rd Freedom Day Classic
2016
 African Road Championships
1st  Team time trial
7th Time trial
 2nd Road race, National Road Championships
 3rd 947 Cycle Challenge

References

External links
 

1983 births
South African female cyclists
Living people
Sportspeople from Pretoria
African Games gold medalists for South Africa
African Games medalists in cycling
African Games silver medalists for South Africa
African Games bronze medalists for South Africa
Competitors at the 2011 All-Africa Games
Competitors at the 2015 African Games
21st-century South African women